Vijendra Prakash  is a Fijian politician and Member of the Parliament of Fiji for the FijiFirst Party. He was elected to Parliament in the 2018 election.

References

Living people
Indian members of the Parliament of Fiji
FijiFirst politicians
Fijian educators
Politicians from Naitasiri Province
Year of birth missing (living people)
Politicians from Nasinu